Lake Nona Medical City is a  health and life sciences park in Orlando, Florida, United States. It is located near Orlando International Airport and within the master-planned community of Lake Nona. The city is home to the University of Central Florida's Health Sciences Campus, which includes the university's College of Medicine and Burnett School of Biomedical Sciences. In the future, the campus will also house UCF's University of Central Florida College of Nursing, the University of Central Florida College of Dental Medicine, and a teaching hospital.

The medical city also includes the Sanford-Burnham Medical Research Institute, Nemours Children’s Hospital, a University of Florida Academic and Research Center, and Valencia College at Lake Nona. In addition, the Orlando Veterans Administration Medical Center, began seeing clinical patients from February 2015.

History

In March 2006, the Florida Board of Governors voted to approve UCF's proposal to build a medical college at Lake Nona, and the school greeted its first students in fall 2009. In 2012, UCF purchased an additional  of land at Lake Nona to construct a teaching hospital.

Development
The medical city is surrounded by education facilities, five million square feet of commercial and retail space, and a mix of residential options. Upon completion of construction of the various projects, UCF's Health Science Campus will accommodate as many as 5,000 upper division, professional, and graduate students and faculty members in the health-related programs, and include up to two million square feet of research and instruction space. It is estimated that the medical city will create up to 30,000 jobs and have a $7.6 billion impact on the economy over the next decade.

Lake Nona is a  master-planned community. Forty percent of the community has been reserved for open green space and lakes.

References

External links

Medicine, College of
University of Florida
Healthcare in Orlando, Florida
Greater Orlando
2005 establishments in Florida